Ord is a fictional character, a supervillain appearing in American comic books published by Marvel Comics. The character has been depicted specifically as an enemy of the X-Men. He first appeared in Astonishing X-Men #1 in May 2004. He was created by writer Joss Whedon and artist John Cassaday.

Fictional character biography

Ord's mission 
Ord is a member of an alien race from a planet called the Breakworld. He was sent to Earth by the ruler of the Breakworld, Powerlord Kruun, on a mission to stop a mutant from Earth from destroying their planet (an event predicted using their race's advanced technology). To this end Ord obtained the body of the X-Man Colossus and resurrected him using superior Breakworld technology. Ord proceeded to experiment on Colossus and with the assistance of the human scientist Dr. Kavita Rao using his DNA to develop a cure for the mutant condition in the hope that this would prevent the destruction of his planet. In doing all this Ord was acting with the tacit consent of Special Agent Abigail Brand, the head of S.W.O.R.D. who was attempting to avert a potential war between Earth and the Breakworld.

Encounters with the X-Men 
During their first encounter Ord nearly defeated the latest X-Men team—consisting of Cyclops, Emma Frost, Beast, Shadowcat and Wolverine—but was caught off guard by Lockheed, who disfigured his face with a fire blast. Later, Ord was nearly killed by an enraged Colossus after he had been released by his X-Men comrades, but was prevented from doing so by Special Agent Brand and Nick Fury accompanied by S.H.I.E.L.D. agents (Although Fury was tempted to leave Brand with the enraged X-Men after learning that she'd known about Colossus's captivity all along). After one last attempt to escape aboard a spaceship was thwarted by Colossus and Wolverine's use of the fastball special - Wolverine being thrown up to Ord's ship and subsequently sticking his hand in Ord's mouth, pointing out to Ord that he'd regrow the hand if Ord bit down but Ord wouldn't re-grow his head if Wolverine had to extend his claws - Ord was delivered into the custody of S.W.O.R.D. Later Ord escaped from the Peak, a space station in orbit around the Earth, with the assistance of Danger and attacked the X-Men while they were under attack by Cassandra Nova. Ord and Danger were subsequently captured by S.W.O.R.D, along with the X-Men, and teleported aboard a starship headed for Breakworld. Ord was able to contact his homeworld to alert them that Colossus was also aboard, an event deliberately engineered by Agent Brand to draw Breakworld's forces away from Earth. When the S.W.O.R.D. starship was captured by the Breakworlders, Ord was taken prisoner, charged with the failure of his mission, a crime punishable by death.

He meets his final fate trying to save Colossus from Aghanne, the rebellious prophet trying to use Colossus' organic metal body to rip off the energy core of the Breakworld, which would ultimately spell the planet's destruction. This was because in Aghanne's eyes living under the tyrannical rule of Kruun in a world that valued strength and violence over love and compassion is a fate worse than death itself. Even though he was unable to withstand the harsh condition around the energy core, he sacrifices himself by breaking off without the needed suit, enabling Colossus to rip out Aghanne's own suit and save himself and the planet.

He then dies, self immolating in the highly radioactive atmosphere of the reactor.

Powers and abilities
Ord possesses strength much greater than that of a human and is also capable of flight. It is unclear whether these attributes are shared by all members of his race, or if they are the product of alien technology.

References

External links
 Ord at Marvel.com

Characters created by Joss Whedon
Comics characters introduced in 2004
Fictional characters with superhuman durability or invulnerability
Marvel Comics aliens
Marvel Comics characters who can move at superhuman speeds
Marvel Comics characters with superhuman strength
Marvel Comics extraterrestrial supervillains
Marvel Comics male supervillains
Marvel Comics martial artists